The 2003 Cup of Russia was the fifth event of six in the 2003–04 ISU Grand Prix of Figure Skating, a senior-level international invitational competition series. It was held at the Luzhniki Palace of Sports in Moscow on November 20–23. Medals were awarded in the disciplines of men's singles, ladies' singles, pair skating, and ice dancing. Skaters earned points toward qualifying for the 2003–04 Grand Prix Final. The compulsory dance was the Ravensburger Waltz.

Results

Men

Ladies

Pairs

Ice dancing

External links
 2003 Cup of Russia
 Liashenko, Plushenko recover to win Cup of Russia USA Today

Cup of Russia
Cup of Russia
Rostelecom Cup
November 2003 sports events in Russia